Stěžery is a municipality and village in Hradec Králové District in the Hradec Králové Region of the Czech Republic. It has about 2,100 inhabitants.

Administrative parts
Villages of Charbuzice, Hřibsko and Stěžírky are administrative parts of Stěžery.

Geography
It lies in the East Elbe Table.

History
The first written mention of Stěžery is from 1229.

Sights
The wooden Church of Saint Mark the Evangelist was first mentioned in 1350 or 1355. In 1832, it was replaced by the current construction in the Empire style.

Stěžery Castle was originally a fortress, rebuilt in 1802–1803 in a Renaissance style by Ernst Christoph von Harrach. The original fortress formd the northern wing of the castle. Today's appearance is mainly the result of modern reconstructions.

References

External links

Villages in Hradec Králové District